Kjell-Åke Gunnar Andersson (born 7 June 1949 in Malmö) is a Swedish film director, screenwriter and cinematographer. His 1992 film Night of the Orangutan was nominated for Best Film, Best Director and Best Screenplay at the 28th Guldbagge Awards.

Selected filmography
1980 - Vi hade i alla fall tur med vädret (screenwriter and cinematographer)
1988 - Friends
1992 - Night of the Orangutan
1996 - Juloratoriet (director and screenwriter)
2001 - Familjehemligheter (director and screenwriter)
2002 - Stackars Tom (TV) (director)
2003 - Mamma pappa barn (director)
2005 - Wallander – Innan frosten (director)
2008 - Vi hade i alla fall tur med vädret – igen

References

External links
 
 

Living people
1949 births
People from Malmö
Swedish screenwriters
Swedish male screenwriters
Swedish film directors
Swedish cinematographers